Jennings County is a county located in the U.S. state of Indiana.  As of 2020, the population was 27,613. The county seat is Vernon.

History
Jennings County was formed in 1817. It was named for the first Governor of Indiana and a nine-term congressman, Jonathan Jennings. Jennings was governor when the county was organized.

Geography
It is a rural county, with majority of the county consisting of personal farms and woodlands. There are only two incorporated towns in this county, Vernon, the county seat, and North Vernon. Both are quite small and underdeveloped by urban standards. The county is located in the center of an imaginary triangle consisting of Indianapolis, IN, Cincinnati, OH,  and Louisville, KY and requires only 1 hour drive time to any of these urban centers.

It is also home to the Muscatatuck Urban Training Center, located just outside North Vernon, at which various training exercises and scenarios are conducted for homeland security and other similar purposes.

City
 North Vernon

Town
 Vernon

Census-designated places
 Butlerville
 Country Squire Lakes
 Hayden
 Scipio

Other unincorporated places

 Brewersville
 Commiskey
 Four Corners
 Grayford
 Hilltown
 Lovett
 Nebraska
 Paris
 Paris Crossing
 Queensville
 San Jacinto
 Walnut Ridge
 Zenas

Townships

 Bigger
 Campbell
 Center
 Columbia
 Geneva
 Lovett
 Marion
 Montgomery
 Sand Creek
 Spencer
 Vernon

Adjacent counties
 Decatur County  (north)
 Ripley County  (east)
 Jefferson County  (southeast)
 Scott County  (south)
 Jackson County (west)
 Bartholomew County (northwest)

Major highways
Sources:  National Atlas, U.S. Census Bureau
  U.S. Route 50
  State Road 3
  State Road 7
  State Road 250

Parks and protected areas
 Big Oaks National Wildlife Refuge (part)
 Muscatatuck National Wildlife Refuge (part)
 Muscatatuck County Park
 Selmier State Forest

Climate and weather 

Government

The county government is a constitutional body, and is granted specific powers by the Constitution of Indiana, and by the Indiana Code.

County Council: The county council is the legislative branch of the county government and controls all the spending and revenue collection in the county. Representatives are elected from county districts. The council members serve four-year terms. They are responsible for setting salaries, the annual budget, and special spending. The council also has limited authority to impose local taxes, in the form of an income and property tax that is subject to state level approval, excise taxes, and service taxes.

Board of Commissioners: The executive body of the county is made of a board of commissioners. The commissioners are elected county-wide, in staggered terms, and each serves a four-year term. One of the commissioners, typically the most senior, serves as president. The commissioners are charged with executing the acts legislated by the council, collecting revenue, and managing the day-to-day functions of the county government.

Court: The county maintains a small claims court that can handle some civil cases. The judge on the court is elected to a term of four years and must be a member of the Indiana Bar Association. The judge is assisted by a constable who is also elected to a four-year term. In some cases, court decisions can be appealed to the state level circuit court.

County Officials: The county has several other elected offices, including sheriff, coroner, auditor, treasurer, recorder, surveyor, and circuit court clerk Each of these elected officers serves a term of four years and oversees a different part of county government. Members elected to county government positions are required to declare party affiliations and to be residents of the county.

Jennings County is part of Indiana's 6th congressional district and is represented in Congress by Republican Greg Pence.  It is also part of Indiana Senate districts 43 and 45 and Indiana House of Representatives districts 66 and 69.

Jennings County is, and has historically been, a staunchly Republican county and in the top 5 highest taxed counties in the state.  Democratic presidential candidates have won Jennings County only thrice in the past 130 years.

Demographics

As of the 2010 United States Census, there were 28,525 people, 10,680 households, and 7,733 families residing in the county. The racial makeup of the county was 96.8% white, 0.8% black or African American, 0.2% Asian, 0.1% American Indian, 1.0% from other races, and 1.2% from two or more races. Those of Hispanic or Latino origin made up 2.0% of the population. In terms of ancestry, 26.2% were German, 16.3% were Irish, 14.7% were American, and 7.2% were English.

Of the 10,680 households, 36.8% had children under the age of 18 living with them, 54.7% were married couples living together, 11.5% had a female householder with no husband present, 27.6% were non-families, and 22.3% of all households were made up of individuals. The average household size was 2.64 and the average family size was 3.06. The median age was 38.4 years.

The median income for a household in the county was $47,697 and the median income for a family was $48,470. Males had a median income of $38,506 versus $27,633 for females. The per capita income for the county was $18,636. About 8.9% of families and 12.3% of the population were below the poverty line, including 16.1% of those under age 18 and 5.4% of those age 65 or over.

Education
Jennings County residents may obtain a library card from the Jennings County Public Library in North Vernon.

In popular culture

Jennings County is the setting of the novel The Friendly Persuasion, later adapted into the Oscar-nominated film Friendly Persuasion in 1956. Although initially planned to be filmed on location, it was finally filmed in California.

Notable residents
 Sarah T. Bolton, poet
 Ovid Butler, founder of Butler University
 Royce Campbell, jazz guitarist
 Cliff Daringer, Federal League baseball player
 Rolla Daringer, Major League Baseball player
 Lincoln Dixon, U.S. Representative from Indiana, 1905–1919
 Scott Earl, Major League Baseball player
 Robert Sanford Foster, Civil War General
 John "Spider" Miller, 2015 & 2017 Walker Cup team captain
 Jethro New, frontiersmen, Continental Army officer
 Jeptha D. New, U.S. Representative from Indiana, 1875–1877, 1879–1881
 John C. New, Treasurer of the United States, 1875-1876
 Horatio C. Newcomb, Mayor of Indianapolis, 1849-1851
 Hannah Milhous Nixon, mother of President Richard Nixon
 Pat O'Connor, polesitter for the 1957 Indianapolis 500 and member of the National Sprint Car Hall of Fame
 Mike Simon, Major League Baseball player
 Jessamyn West, author
 Edgar Whitcomb, 43rd Governor of Indiana
 Albert Edward Wiggam, psychologist, lecturer, and author

References

See also
 National Register of Historic Places listings in Jennings County, Indiana
 USS Jennings County (LST-846)

 
Indiana counties
1817 establishments in Indiana
Populated places established in 1817